Cryptothele is a spider genus with 10 described species, now placed in the family Zodariidae.

This genus was the sole member of the family Cryptothelidae, which is no longer accepted.

Distribution
The genus occurs in mainly in tropical Asia and Australasia.

Species
, the World Spider Catalog accepted the following species:

 Cryptothele alluaudi Simon, 1893 — Seychelles
 Cryptothele ceylonica O. P-Cambridge, 1877 — Sri Lanka
 Cryptothele collina Pocock, 1901 — India
 Cryptothele cristata Simon, 1884 — Unknown
 Cryptothele doreyana Simon, 1890 — New Guinea, Queensland
 Cryptothele marchei Simon, 1890 — New Caledonia, Mariana Islands
 Cryptothele sundaica Thorell, 1890 — Singapore, Sumatra, Java
 Cryptothele sundaica amplior Kulczyński, 1911 — Indonesia (Sunda Is.)
 Cryptothele sundaica javana Kulczyński, 1911 — Indonesia (Java)
 Cryptothele verrucosa L. Koch, 1872 — Samoa, Fiji

References

Zodariidae
Araneomorphae genera
Spiders of Asia